Nagumi, also known as Ngong (Gong), is an extinct Jarawan language of the North Province of Cameroon. It had only two fluent speakers in 1983 and only one in 1995.

References

Languages of Cameroon
Extinct languages of Africa
Jarawan languages